Namthang-Rateypani Assembly constituency is one of the 32 assembly constituencies of Sikkim a north east state of India. Namthang-Rateypani is part of Sikkim Lok Sabha constituency.

Members of Legislative Assembly
 2009: Tilu Gurung, Sikkim Democratic Front
 2014: Tilu Gurung, Sikkim Democratic Front

Election results

2019

See also

 Namthang
 South Sikkim district
 List of constituencies of Sikkim Legislative Assembly

References

Assembly constituencies of Sikkim
Namchi district